Susan Lowe (born Laura Susan Lowe on January 19, 1948 in Reidsville, North Carolina) is an American actress, educator and painter. She has appeared exclusively in the works of John Waters for most of her career, starring in ten of his films.

About 
Lowe was born in Reidsville, North Carolina on January 19, 1948. She was a student at the Maryland Institute College of Art (MICA) in the 1960s, when she became friends with Divine and other Dreamlanders.

Her first role with Waters was playing an asylum inmate in Mondo Trasho. She continued to play small parts in many of his films, but played the lead role of Mole McHenry, the ultra-butch bleach blonde lesbian, in Desperate Living.

She has taught art history classes at MICA, Catonsville Community College, and University of Maryland.

Personal life
Lowe has been married twice, and has two children. Her first husband, surnamed McLean, was a drawing teacher at the Maryland Institute College of Art (MICA), where Lowe had worked as a model. They wed in Ireland and had two children, Ruby and Ramsey McLean. The marriage ended seven years later. She later married Frank Tomboro of Baltimore. That union also ended in divorce.

Filmography

References

External links 

 Interview: A Conversation with Susan Lowe (2015) from WYPR

American film actresses
1948 births
Living people
Maryland Institute College of Art alumni
People from Reidsville, North Carolina
21st-century American women